Ceri Ann Davies (born 15 December 1978), married name Ceri Ann Glen is an international lawn bowls player.

Bowls career
She made her debut for Wales aged just eleven. After competing for Wales since the age of eleven, she moved to Australia where she was courted by their Talent Identification Programme. After switching allegiance to Australia she won a silver medal in the triples at the 2006 Commonwealth Games in Melbourne.

In 2008, she won the Women's singles and Mixed pairs during the 2008 World Indoor Bowls Championship and one year later she retained the Mixed pairs title at the 2009 World Indoor Bowls Championship with David Gourlay.

She won a bronze medal at the 2007 Asia Pacific Bowls Championships in Christchurch.

In 2023, representing Wales, she won the 2023 World Indoor Bowls Championship mixed pairs final, with Stewart Anderson.

Professional career
Ceri Ann Davies has worked as a sport psychologist, coach and high performance manager. She is currently the Performance Pathway Manager for Olympic and Paralympic Archery for Great Britain.

Personal life
She married Dr. Ian Glen in December, 2012 and together they have two children.

References

External links
 
 
 

Living people
1978 births
Bowls players at the 2006 Commonwealth Games
Australian female bowls players
Commonwealth Games medallists in lawn bowls
Indoor Bowls World Champions
Commonwealth Games silver medallists for Australia
Medallists at the 2006 Commonwealth Games